Cacoo is web-based software for designing and drawing diagrams.

History
Cacoo was launched in 2009 by Nulab, Inc. In 2013, the on-premise Enterprise version of the software was launched.

Cacoo is written in HTML5 and runs on major Window browsers and Mac operating systems.

Usage
Cacoo is used for creating flowcharts, wireframes, UML diagrams, Organizational charts, and network diagrams.

See also
 Web design
 Unified Modeling Language
 Computer network diagram

References

External links
 https://cacoo.com/

Web software